"Believe Me" is a song written by Randy Bachman and performed by The Guess Who.  It reached #10 in Canada in 1966.  The song was released in the United States as a single, but it did not chart.  It was featured on their 1966 album, It's Time.

The song was produced by Bob Burns and arranged & sung by Chad Allan.  It was the first single to feature Burton Cummings, who would later become the lead singer of the band, on the piano, replacing Bob Ashley.

References

1966 songs
1966 singles
Songs written by Randy Bachman
The Guess Who songs
Quality Records singles
Scepter Records singles